Albrecht Holder (born 24 August 1958) is a leading German classical bassoonist.

Life
Born in Reutlingen, Germany, Holder initially studied singing with Siegfried Jerusalem, and then at the Musikhochschule Stuttgart with Herrmann Herder and at the Royal Northern College of Music in Manchester with William Waterhouse. He was later principal bassoonist of the Stuttgart Philharmonic Orchestra.

References
 https://web.archive.org/web/20080602215802/http://www.stepnote.co.uk/instruments/bassoon.php

1958 births
Living people
German classical bassoonists
Academic staff of the Maastricht Academy of Music
People from Reutlingen
State University of Music and Performing Arts Stuttgart alumni